Lady Aitchison Hospital is a maternity hospital located in Lahore, Punjab, Pakistan. It is a teaching hospital of King Edward Medical College.

History
Lady Aitchison Hospital was founded on February 15, 1887 by Lady Beatrice Lyell Aitchison, the wife of Charles Umpherston Aitchison who founded Aitchison College.

References

External links
 Lady Aitchison Hospital

Hospitals in Lahore
Teaching hospitals in Pakistan
Hospital buildings completed in 1985
Hospitals established in 1887
King Edward Medical University
1887 establishments in British India